Santa Barbara Business College (SBBCollege) was a private, for-profit college with multiple locations in California.  It was founded in 1888 as a co-ed finishing college in Santa Barbara. SBBCollege expanded its program fields and campus locations to four campuses and an online campus.

Accreditations
SBBCollege is accredited by the Accrediting Council for Independent Colleges and Schools to award certificates, diplomas, associate degrees, bachelor's degrees and master's degrees. The vocational nursing program is at SBBCollege accredited by the State of California Board of Vocational Nursing and Psychiatric Technicians.

History
SBBCollege is one of the oldest colleges in California. Founded in 1888, the College educated area teachers and offered courses in banking, merchandising, shorthand, typing and business law.

Over the years, SBBCollege added new programs to meet the demands of emerging industries and expanded to five communities in Southern California. During the last part of the 20th century, the College added medical, legal and information technology programs. Recently, SBBCollege added bachelor's degrees in business administration, criminal justice and healthcare administration and an MBA program.

In 2020, SBBCollege was acquired by San Joaquin Valley College. Subsequently, all SBBCollege campuses are no longer enrolling students.

Locations
SBBCollege currently has campuses in the following California communities, including an online campus:

Santa Maria
303 E Plaza Drive, Santa Maria, CA 93454 
Programs offered: Business Administration, Criminal Justice, Medical Assisting, Pharmacy Technology, Healthcare Administration, Medical Billing and Coding, Vocational Nursing, and Medical Office Administration.
Bakersfield 
5300 California Ave., Bakersfield, CA 93304
Programs offered: Business Administration, Criminal Justice, Paralegal Studies, Healthcare Administration, Medical Billing and Coding, Medical Assisting, Vocational Nursing, and Medical Office Administration.
Ventura 
4839 Market Street, Ventura, CA 93003
Programs offered: Business Administration, Criminal Justice, Paralegal Studies, Healthcare Administration, Medical Billing and Coding, Medical Office Administration, Medical Assisting and Aviation.
Rancho Mirage
 34-275 Monterey Avenue, Rancho Mirage, California 92270
Programs offered: Business Administration, Criminal Justice, Paralegal Studies, Medical Assisting, Healthcare Administration, Medical Billing and Coding, Vocational Nursing, and Medical Office Administration.
Online
Programs offered: Business Administration, Criminal Justice, Paralegal Studies, Healthcare Administration, Medical Billing and Coding, Medical Office Administration and an online MBA program.

References

External links
 Official website

Universities and colleges in Santa Barbara County, California
Educational institutions established in 1888
1888 establishments in California